Jenny Dürst and Weronika Falkowska won the title, defeating Michaela Bayerlová and Jacqueline Cabaj Awad in the final, 7–6(7–5), 6–1.

Amina Anshba and Anastasia Gasanova were the defending champions but chose not to participate.

Seeds

Draw

Draw

References

External Links
Main Draw

TCCB Open - Doubles